"Shadows on the Mountainside" is a song by Canadian rock band The Tea Party. It was released as a promotional single in Australia. The music video directed by Jeff Renfrew, was shot at Websters FallsDundas, Ontario (near Hamilton) and only screened in Australia until the release of Illuminations.

"Shadows on the Mountainside" is a folk inspired composition written for Gibson harp guitar, mandolin and tabla drums. The band's first public performance of the song was in April 1994 on Australian radio station Triple J.

Track listing 
"Shadows on the Mountainside"

References

External links
 Live performance

1995 singles
The Tea Party songs
Song recordings produced by Ed Stasium